Lars Otto Olsen (born 29 June 1965) is a Danish former cyclist. He competed in the team pursuit event at the 1988 Summer Olympics.

References

External links

1965 births
Living people
Danish male cyclists
Olympic cyclists of Denmark
Cyclists at the 1988 Summer Olympics
Cyclists from Copenhagen